Jean-Claude Tochon is a retired Swiss slalom canoeist who competed in the 1950s and the 1960s. He won six bronze medals at the ICF Canoe Slalom World Championships (C-1: 1957, 1963; C-1 team: 1955, 1959, 1961, 1963).

References

Living people
Swiss male canoeists
Year of birth missing (living people)
Medalists at the ICF Canoe Slalom World Championships